PNG Football Stadium (known as Lloyd Robson Oval until 2015) is a sporting ground in Port Moresby, Papua New Guinea. It hosted three games for the 1989–1992 Rugby League World Cup. It has been the home ground for the Papua New Guinea national rugby league team since 1975. It has a total capacity of approximately 15,000 and is the National Stadium of Papua New Guinea. The stadium was completely redeveloped in preparation for the 2015 Pacific Games.

History
Lloyd Robson Oval hosted its first Rugby league international on 6 July 1975 when PNG played host to England who were on their way to Australia and New Zealand for the down under leg of the 1975 World Cup. In front of an enthusiastic crowd of 12,000 England ran out 40-12 winners in what was the Kumuls international debut game.

PNG played the 1982 and 1986 Kangaroos at the oval. The Australians, unbeaten on both Kangaroo Tours, won both games 38-2 and 62-12 respectively. The 1986 game saw the Oval's record attendance when 17,000 enthusiastic fans saw the Kangaroos defeat the Kumuls.

The opening Test match of the 1988 Great Britain Lions tour was played at the Oval between Papua New Guinea and the British before a crowd of 12,107.

Lloyd Robson Oval was the primary venue of the 2009 Pacific Cup. The four round-robin matches were played at the ground on 24–25 October and 31 October, with the final played on 1 November 2009.

The oval is also home of the Port Moresby Vipers and Gulf Isou who play in the PNGNRL Digicel Cup.

Lloyd Robson is also a regular host of the annual rugby league game between the Kumuls and an Australian Prime Minister's XIII at the conclusion of the Australian-based National Rugby League season. These games are usually well attended, with 16,000 attending the game in 2012 won 24-18 by the Mal Meninga coached PM's XIII.

Soccer is also played at the Lloyd Robson Oval, with both the national men's and women's PNG teams, as well as Papua New Guinea National Soccer League playing matches at the ground, though they both generally use the Sir Hubert Murray Stadium.

At the 2016 FIFA U-20 Women's World Cup, it hosted many matches, including the final.

Rugby league test matches
List of rugby league test matches played at Lloyd Robson Oval.

Rugby League World Cup
List of Rugby League World Cup matches played at Lloyd Robson Oval.Results are from the 1985-88, 1989-1992, and 2017 World Cups.

Non-test internationals

See also

List of national stadiums
Rugby League World Cup venues

References

External links
 

Sports venues in Papua New Guinea
Rugby league in Papua New Guinea
Papua New Guinea
Buildings and structures in Port Moresby
Rugby League World Cup stadiums
Papua New Guinea Hunters